Gladys Hulette (July 21, 1896 – August 8, 1991) was an American silent film actress from Arcade, New York, United States. Her career began in the early years of silent movies and continued until the mid-1930s. She first performed on stage at the age of three and on screen when she was seven years old. Hulette was also a talented artist. Her mother was an opera star.

Child actress

Hulette was among the principal players in Sappho and Phaon which had its first performance in Providence, Rhode Island on October 4, 1907. She helped support Bertha Kalich in the Percy MacKaye production. As a child she also appeared in Romeo and Juliet (1908) and The Smoke Fairy (1909). On Broadway, in The Blue Bird (1910), she played Tyltyl. She was the sweet youth, Beth, in Little Women (1912). Her other Broadway credits included The Kreutzer Sonata (1906), A Doll's House (1907), and The Faith Healer (1910).

Silent film player

In her earliest motion picture features she was under contract to Vitagraph Studios. There was a stigma for Broadway theater actors to be seen in motion pictures when silent films first began to be made. Hulette later discussed this, saying "the picture heroes were mostly Coney Island life savers." One company prevailed upon a leading stage actor to play the role of Hamlet on screen. This began the influx of more Broadway actors into the new medium.

By 1917 Hulette's films were being produced by leading director William Parke. In that year she made her most popular film to date, Streets of Illusion. Playing the part of Beam, Hulette's co-stars included Richard Barthelmess and J.H. Gilmour. Parke owned theatrical companies and assisted Hulette in making one hit after another.

She married William Parke Jr., the director's son in 1917.  They divorced in 1924.

By 1921 she was a veteran of the motion picture industry. She again played opposite Barthelmess, this time in Tol'able David.  She played the ingenue part of Esther Hatburn. In an interview she said she wished for no different type of roles than the one she played in this film. Later she sought comedy-drama parts which she portrayed in Jack O' Hearts (1926) and A Bowery Cinderella (1927).

She researched her own roles, such as the dance hall girl she played in The U.P. Trail (1924). Hulette consulted Social Life of the Pioneers for the Fox Film production, filmed over a period of two months in Nevada. The book was published in the 1880s in San Francisco, California. She discovered that saloons in America's old west provided a softening influence, and the nucleus of community consciousness. This was due to the young women entertainers found there.

Late career
Hulette made her debut in sound films in  Torch Singer (1933). Her final film appearances came in Her Resale Value (1933) and with uncredited roles in The Girl From Missouri and One Hour Late, both from 1934. In 1948 Gladys Hulette and another former Thanhouser player, Grace DeCarlton, were both working as ticket sellers at Radio City Music Hall in New York City.

In the early 1980s, the aged Hulette was visited by film historian Walter Coppedge and lived under distressed circumstances as a ward of the state in an institution in Rosemead. But Coppedge also wrote: "Yet her eyes are bright, her figure supple, her complexion pink and porcelain. She is still graciously appreciative of kindness, especially the assurance that she would not be forgotten as long as people look at her films."

Death
Gladys Hulette died in Montebello, California in 1991, aged 95.

Selected filmography

 Romeo and Juliet (1908)
 Princess Nicotine; or, The Smoke Fairy (1909)
 A Midsummer Night's Dream (1909)
 Alice's Adventures in Wonderland (1910)
 The Active Life of Dolly of the Dailies (1914)
 Eugene Aram (1915)
 The Shine Girl (1916)
In the Name of the Law (1916)
 Prudence the Pirate (1916)
 A Crooked Romance (1917)
 The Cigarette Girl (1917)
 Her New York (1917)
 The Candy Girl (1917)
 The Streets of Illusion (1917)
 The Last of the Carnabys (1917)
 Over the Hill (1917)
 Miss Nobody (1917)
 Annexing Bill (1918)
 Waifs (1918)
 The Silent Barrier (1920)
 Tol'able David (1921)
 The Referee (1922)
 Fair Lady (1922)
 How Women Love (1922)
 The Secrets of Paris (1922)
 Enemies of Women (1923)
 Hoodman Blind (1923)
 As a Man Lives (1923)
 The Iron Horse (1924)
 The Slanderers (1924)
 The Family Secret (1924)
 The Night Message (1924)
 The Ridin' Kid from Powder River (1924)
 The Thoroughbred (1925)
 Private Affairs (1925)
 Lena Rivers (1925)
 The Pride of the Force (1925)
 The Mystic (1925)
 Go Straight (1925)
 The Skyrocket (1926)
 Be Your Age (1926)
 The Night Owl (1926)
 The Warning Signal (1926)
 Unknown Treasures (1926)
 Combat (1927)
 A Bowery Cinderella (1927)
 Faithless Lover (1928)
 Making the Varsity (1928)
 Life's Crossroads (1928)
Her Resale Value (1933)

References

 Fort Wayne, Indiana News, "Gladys Hulette", September 13, 1917, Page 5.
 Los Angeles Times, "She's Champion of Dance Hall Girls", April 13, 1924, Page B19.
 Los Angeles Times, "Tell Us What You Think", December 14, 1924, Page C32.
 Oakland Tribune, "Gladys Hulette Talks of Old Days as Child in Vitagraph", Sunday Morning, August 28, 1921, Page 21.
 New York Times, "Amusement Notes", September 9, 1907, Page 7.
 Reno Evening Gazette, "Old Favorite Is Seen Again", September 9, 1933, Page 8.

External links

 
 
Gladys Hulette silent era portrait

20th-century American actresses
American child actresses
American stage actresses
American film actresses
American silent film actresses
Western (genre) film actresses
Actresses from New York (state)
1896 births
1991 deaths
People from Arcade, New York
People from Montebello, California
Burials at Rose Hills Memorial Park